Bruciana pediger is a species of crab in the family Xanthidae, the only species in the genus Bruciana.

References

Xanthoidea
Monotypic decapod genera